Neha Kakkar Singh (née Kakkar; born 6 June 1988), is an Indian playback singer. She is the younger sister of playback singer Sonu Kakkar. She began performing at a very early age at religious events. In 2005, she participated in the second season of the singing reality show, Indian Idol. She made her Bollywood debut as a chorus singer in the film Meerabai Not Out. She rose to prominence with the release of the dance track "Second Hand Jawaani" from Cocktail (2012), which was followed by several popular party songs, including "Sunny Sunny" from Yaariyan and "London Thumakda" from the 2014 soundtrack album Queen. Apart from playback singing, Kakkar has appeared in several music videos and as a judge on several television reality shows, including "Indian Idol".

In 2019, Kakkar was listed among the most-viewed female artists on YouTube with 13.9 billion views. In January 2021, she became the first Indian singer to win a YouTube Diamond Award.

She appeared in the India Forbes Celebrity 100 in 2017 and 2019. In December 2020, she appeared on the list of Asia's 100 Digital Stars by Forbes.

Early life 
Kakkar was born on 6 June 1988, in Rishikesh in the state of Uttar Pradesh (now Uttarakhand). In the early 1990s, Kakkar along with her family, moved to Delhi to try her luck at singing. Kakkar, at the age of four, started performing at local gatherings and religious event. In 2004, she moved to Mumbai along with her brother, Tony Kakkar. In 2006, at the age of eighteen, Kakkar auditioned for the second season of Indian Idol where she got eliminated early in the show.

Career

2005–2012: Career beginnings and breakthrough with Cocktail 
In 2005, she participated in the second season of the singing reality show Indian Idol, in which she was eliminated early.

In 2008, she launched her debut album, Neha The Rockstar with music by Meet Bros. Anjjan. During this time, she recorded for a music album, Romeo Juliet composed by her brother, Tony Kakkar. She sang "Hai Rama" from Meerabai Not Out (2008) along with Sukhwinder Singh. The following year, she was featured in A.R. Rahman's composition, the theme song of Blue (2009), where she provided the chorus vocals for the song. She then lent her voice for the title track of the Hindi-language soap opera Na Aana Is Des Laado (2009).

In 2010, Kakkar made her screen debut with Vidhi Kasliwal's film Isi Life Mein...! (2010) in which she played the role of a college student. The same year, she debuted in both the Kannada and Telugu music industry by performing a total of four tracks for Sandeep Chowta. She lent her voice for the title track of the Kannada film Thamassu and the song "Nodu Baare" alongside Master Saleem. The former resulted in her only Filmfare Awards South nomination as the Best Female Playback Singer.

She appeared in the second season of Comedy Circus Ke Taansen alongside Kapil Sharma and Ali Asgar. The following year, her collaboration with Pritam for the dance track "Second Hand Jawaani" from Cocktail proved to be a major breakthrough for Kakkar. The song went to become popular among the music listeners, though it received mixed to negative reviews from critics. In 2012, she released "SRK Anthem" on YouTube, a tribute to actor Shah Rukh Khan.

2013–2016: Chart-busters with Fever and Baar Baar Dekho 
Kakkar's first release of 2013, "Botal Khol" from Prague, met with controversy, where Central Board of Film Certification raised objections on the song citing that its lyrics contain double meaning. This was followed by a Sachin–Jigar's item number composed for Ramaiya Vastavaiya. Titled "Jadoo Ki Jhappi". She next collaborated with Pritam for another item song, "Dhating Nach", performed alongside Nakash Aziz and Shefali Alvares.

2014 saw the rise of Kakkar with the release of three popular songs. The first release of the year was a collaboration with Yo Yo Honey Singh for the film Yaariyan. The duo collaborated once again for Bollywood's first trance number, "Manali Trance" from The Shaukeens. Her first work with Amit Trivedi, a wedding song titled "London Thumakda" was released in the same year and received positive reviews from critics. On the occasion of Mother's Day, Kakkar shot and released a song for her mother which gained a positive response among the audience.

Kakkar's first release of 2015 came with "Ek Do Teen Chaar" from Ek Paheli Leela which was composed, penned and co-sung by Tony Kakkar.  She then collaborated with the music composer duo, Amjad-Nadeem where she performed the tracks "Naughty No 1" and "Daaru Peeke Dance" for Barkhaa and Kuch Kuch Locha Hai respectively Kakkar sang the Meet Bros-composed "Tu Isaq Mera" from Hate Story 3. Her last release of the year was "Tukur Tukur" from Dilwale, along with Arijit Singh, Kanika Kapoor, Siddharth Mahadevan and Nakash Aziz. The same year, she featured alongside Shilpa Shetty in the video single "Wedding Da Season", composed by Amaal Malik.

In 2016, she performed the popular song "Mile Ho Tum" from the film Fever, composed, written, and co-sung by Tony Kakkar. Credited as the most-viewed Bollywood song on YouTube, the song received a positive response from critics and audiences. Also, she contributed to the soundtrack album of Baar Baar Dekho by performing the wedding-song "Kala Chashma" which became the "party anthem of the year". She worked with Epic Bhangra for the film Sanam Re, where they released the song "Humne Pee Rakhi Hai", a mix of club and EDM. She also provided her vocals for an additional song in the album, "Akkad Bakkad", a rap song performed along with Badshah. Apart from lending her vocals to the party song, "Kar Gayi Chull" from Kapoor & Sons, which was a remake of the Haryanvi track "Chull" and her first recording for Dharma Productions, Kakkar performed several other recreated songs during the year including, "Maahi Ve"–a remake of the song "Maahi Ve" from Kaante (2002)– and "O Janiya"–a remake of the song "Kaante Nahi Kat Te" from Mr. India (1987)–for Wajah Tum Ho and Force 2 respectively.

2017–present: Collaboration with Tanishk Bagchi and series of remade songs 
2017 marked Kakkar's first of many collaborations with Tanishk Bagchi which resulted in the rehashing of several Bollywood songs in the coming years. Their first release, "Badri Ki Dulhania" from Badrinath Ki Dulhania performed with Dev Negi, Ikka Singh and Monali Thakur have few segments lifted from the Shankar-Jaikishen classic, "Chalat Musafir" from Teesri Kasam (1966). The version became an instant chart-buster among the audience and was included in the list of most-viewed Indian videos on YouTube with over 500 million views. This was followed by another chart-buster by the duo, "Cheez Badi" from Machine, a re-creation of the 1994-released Mohra song "Tu Cheez Badi Hai Mast Mast", which got mixed reviews from critics. Her next release was the dance song "Main Tera Boyfriend" from Raabta which was a recreation of a non-film track "Na Na Na Na". The trend was carried forward with Judwaa 2 where she rendered two remake songs, co-composed by Sandeep Shirodkar and Anu Malik and one original song composed by Meet Bros. During the year, she appeared as a judge alongside Himesh Reshammiya and Javed Ali in the sixth season of the Indian television music competition, Sa Re Ga Ma Pa L'il Champs. The year ended with another recreated song, "Mehbooba" from Fukrey Returns, originally performed by Mohammed Rafi for Dharam Veer (1977).

Kakkar's first release of 2018 was Yo Yo Honey Singh's "Chhote Chhote Peg" from Sonu Ke Titu Ki Sweety, a remake of the Anand Raj Anand-composition "Tote Tote Ho Gaya" from Bichhoo (2000). This was followed by Bagchi's recreation of "Aashiq Banaya Apne" included in the soundtrack album of Hate Story 4, originally performed by Himesh Reshamiyya and Shreya Ghoshal. The duo collaborated on five other projects, from which "Dilbar" from Satyameva Jayate and "Aankh Maarey" from Simmba became popular with music listeners, both songs reaching the list of most-viewed Indian videos on YouTube and the former being the first Indian song to reach number three on the Billboard YouTube Music Chart. Apart from rendering the folk pop song "Dholida" from Loveyatri alongside Udit Narayan and Palak Muchhal, Kakkar performed a traditional-themed-contemporary Punjabi track, "Bhangra Da Sajda" from Veere Di Wedding, composed and co-sung by Shashwat Sachdev. The trend continued with the item song "Gali Gali" included in the Hindi-dubbed version of the Kannada film K.G.F: Chapter 1. During the year, she appeared as a judge alongside Anu Malik and Vishal Dadlani in the tenth season of the Indian television music competition, Indian Idol.

2019 began with the release of three remade songs in collaboration with Bagchi, "Chamma Chamma", recreated for the film Fraud Saiyyan–original composition in the film China Gate (1998), while "Coca Cola Tu" from Luka Chuppi and "Hauli Hauli" from De De Pyaar De. The year marked her first collaboration with Vishal Mishra and Vishal–Shekhar, where she performed the female version of "Ki Honda Pyaar" from Jabariya Jodi for the former and "The Hook Up Song" for the latter, which was well received by critics. The trio of Kakkar, Bagchi and dancer Nora Fatehi re-united for two other chart-busters, "O Saki Saki" from Batla House and "Ek Toh Kum Zindagani" from Marjaavaan. The former being a remake of Musafir film's "Saaki", originally performed by Sukhwinder Singh and Sunidhi Chauhan. During the year, Kakkar lent her voice for "Dheeme Dheeme", composed by Bagchi and the romantic love song "Tu Hi Yaar Mera" composed by Rochak Kohli.

From 2017 on, Kakkar, primarily, in collaboration with Tanishk Bagchi, became more associated with the trend of remaking old to very recent songs, which resulted in several backlashes targeted for the singer.

On 12 December 2021, Kakkar performed at the Jubilee Stage at Expo 2020 in Dubai, UAE.

Plagiarism allegations 
Neha Kakkar and her brother Tony Kakkar have been accused of plagiarizing lyrics, visuals, and harmony from several Indian classics on multiple occasions. Several Indian classics and pop songs like Kavita Krishnamurti's "Tu Cheez Badi Hai Mast Mast" and "Tip Tip Barsa Paani", Himesh Reshammiya's "Aashiq Banaya Aapne", Falguni Pathak's "Yaad Piya Ki Aane Lagi", Lata Mangeshkar's "Kaanta Laga", Alka Yagnik's "Chamma Chamma", Poornima's part of "Chalti Hai Kya 9 Se 12", Payal Dev's "Sawan Me Lag Gayi Aag", and several others. Most recently she plagiarized a full theme and harmony of Indian classic singer Falguni Pathak's "Maine Payal Hai Chhankai"(1999) and remade an version named "O Sajna". Even after several appeals and requests from the original playback singers and fans to stop remaking original cult classics, Kakkar does not seem to honor their requests and instead claims that nothing can stop her as she has now gained fame and success in recent post.

Artistry

Voice 
Her voice has been described several times in the media as "distinct", "unique", "chirpy", "seductive" and "partially nasal". She did not take any formal vocal training.

Influence 

Kakkar admits that she has always looked up to her elder sister Sonu, as her singing inspiration and she "guides me on how to sing particular songs". She named her brother Tony as a constant pillar of strength.

Public image 

Kakkar is very active on social media platforms including Instagram, Twitter, Facebook and YouTube page, where she interacts with her fans and regularly posts updates about her life. She is one of the most-followed Indian artistes on Instagram. In October 2019, she received the Instagram trophy, celebrating the first Indian musician and the fifth Indian to reach the milestone.

In 2017, Kakkar was included in the list of 35 boldest entrepreneurs of India who are changing the game in various industries. The same year she appeared in the Forbes Celebrity 100, a list based on income and popularity of India's celebrities. She was listed at the sixty-fourth spot in 2017 and twenty-ninth spot in 2019. In 2019, Kakkar was listed on position second among the most-viewed female artists on YouTube with 4.2 billion views worldwide.

In December 2020, she appeared in the list of Asia's 100 Digital Stars by Forbes.

In December 2020, Neha launched an exclusive Masterclass for the aspiring singers with FrontRow.

Personal life 
Kakkar and actor Himansh Kohli were in a romantic relationship since 2014. In September 2018, they officially announced their relationship on national television and revealed that they will tie the knot soon. However, three months later, an Instagram post by Kakkar revealed that the couple broke-up.

Kakkar met Punjabi musical artist Rohanpreet Singh in Chandigarh for the first time and they soon fell in love. On 24 October 2020, they got married in a Gurdwara in New Delhi.

Awards and achievements

Filmography

Film

Television

Selected discography

See also 
List of Indian playback singers
List of most-viewed Indian music videos on YouTube

References

External links 

 
 

1988 births
Living people
Bollywood playback singers
Indian women playback singers
Singers from Uttarakhand
Women musicians from Uttarakhand
Hindi-language singers
Bengali-language singers
Punjabi-language singers
Indian Idol participants
Indian folk-pop singers
21st-century Indian women singers
21st-century Indian singers